Lesley-Travers Mansion, also known as the Deemer House, Travers House, and Lesley House, is a historic home located at New Castle, New Castle County, Delaware. It was designed by noted Baltimore architects Thomas and James Dixon and built in 1855.  It has a two-story, five bay, brick core with several appendages and wings.  It has a castle-like appearance, with a slate-covered steeply pitched gable roof and five-story tower, and is in the Gothic Revival style.

It was added to the National Register of Historic Places in 1973.

References

External links

Historic American Buildings Survey in Delaware
Houses on the National Register of Historic Places in Delaware
Gothic Revival architecture in Delaware
Houses completed in 1855
Houses in New Castle, Delaware
National Register of Historic Places in New Castle County, Delaware